The Metaltown Festival was a three-day festival featuring heavy metal bands, held in Gothenburg, Sweden. It was arranged annually from 2004 to 2016.

The original Metaltown venue was at Frihamnen, but was moved in 2011 to Göteborg Galopp close to Gothenburg City Airport. The last festivals from 2013-2016 was held indoors at Trädgår'n.

Participating acts

2004
Alice Cooper -
Totalt Jävla Mörker -
Turbonegro -
Dimmu Borgir -
Brides of Destruction -
In Flames -
Kee Marcello's K2 -
Evergrey -
Mustasch -
Edguy -
Within Y -
Debase -
Notre Dame

2005
Apocalyptica -
Dark Tranquillity -
Hanoi Rocks -
HammerFall -
Rammstein -
Beseech -
Enter the Hunt -
Tiamat -
Sentenced -
Nine -
All Ends -
Kakaphonia -
Hell N' Diesel

2006
Cradle of Filth -
Danko Jones -
Electric Earth -
Engel -
Enter the Hunt -
Entombed -
Evergrey -
Fingerspitzengefühl -
Khoma -
Manimal -
Motörhead -
Opeth -
Satyricon -
Soilwork -
Sparzanza -
The Haunted -
Tool - Stonegard

2007
Slayer -
Mastodon -
Machine Head -
Meshuggah -
Raised Fist -
Nine -
Cult of Luna -
Hardcore Superstar -
Sturm und Drang -
Sonic Syndicate -
Marduk -
Ill Niño -
Candlemass -
Entombed

2008
In Flames -
Cavalera Conspiracy -
Nightwish -
Chris Cornell (cancelled) -
Monster Magnet -
Dimmu Borgir -
Danko Jones -
Bullet for My Valentine -
Converge -
Dark Tranquillity -
Finntroll -
Hardcore Superstar -
Sabaton -
Soilwork -
Tiamat -
Amon Amarth -
Clutch -
Job for a Cowboy (cancelled) -
Opeth (cancelled) -
Killswitch Engage -
Nifelheim -
Die Mannequin -
Graveyard -
Sonic Syndicate -
Lillasyster -
Path of No Return -
Sic -
Witchcraft -
Cimmerian Dome -
Dr. Livingdead -
Keld -
Torture Division -
Dead by April (cancelled) -
Avatar -
Marionette -
Satyricon -
The Brother Grim Side Show

2009

All Hell -
All That Remains -
August Burns Red -
Bring Me the Horizon -
Bullet -
Children of Bodom -
Cult of Luna -
Dead by April -
Dir En Grey -
Disturbed -
DragonForce -
Evergrey -
Girugamesh -
Hatesphere -
Hellzapoppin' -
Illfigure -
Marilyn Manson -
Meshuggah -
Mucc -
Municipal Waste -
Mustasch -
My Dying Bride -
Napalm Death -
Opeth -
Pain -
Pilgrimz -
Slipknot -
Sterbhaus -
Trivium -
The Haunted -
Volbeat

2010
69 Eyes -
Adept -
Amon Amarth -
Between the Buried and Me -
Bleeding Through -
Brian "Head" Welch -
Bullet for My Valentine -
Coheed & Cambria -
Cynic -
Dark Tranquillity -
Dream Evil -
Finntroll -
From This Moment -
Garcia Plays Kyuss -
Hatebreed -
Hellyeah -
In Flames -
Katatonia -
Kreator -
Nile -
Rammstein -
Raunchy -
Raubtier -
Sabaton -
Skindred -
Sodom -
Sonic Syndicate -
Soulfly -
Walking with Strangers

2011
Meshuggah -
Cradle of Filth -
Raubtier -
Parkway Drive -
Escape the Fate -
System of a Down -
At the Gates -
The Black Dahlia Murder -
Graveyard -
Soilwork -
Ghost -
Volbeat -
Watain -
Korn -
Khoma -
Cavalera Conspiracy -
All That Remains -
Doctor Midnight & The Mercy Cult -
F.K.Ü -
Deicide -
Bring Me the Horizon -
Arch Enemy -
Avenged Sevenfold -
Anvil -
Bullet -
Human Desolation -
Madball -
Corroded-
Yersinia -
Last View -
Stillwell -
Avenir

2012
In Flames -
Slayer -
Marilyn Manson -
Machine Head -
Lamb of God -
Mastodon -
Killswitch Engage -
Opeth - 
Within Temptation - 
Sabaton - 
Anthrax - 
Kyuss Lives! -
HammerFall -
Nasum -
Dark Tranquility - 
Mayhem - 
Soulfly - 
Candlemass -
Hypocrisy - 
Vader -
Gojira - 
Trivium -
Pain - 
DevilDriver -
Pain of Salvation -
Oz -
Darkest Hour - 
Adept - 
Skeletonwitch -
Engel - 
Avatar - 
Vildhjarta -
Skitarg - 
Unleashed - 
Primordial - 
Death Destruction -
Shining - 
Aura Noir - 
Descend - 
Unpure - 
Year of the Goat -
Sectu -
Kobra and the Lotus - 
Seventribe - 
Dethrone - 
Who Torched Cinderella - 
Alenah - 
Voiceless Location -
Start a Fire -
Imminence -
Jason Rouse

2013
Slipknot -
Korn -
Motörhead - 
Sabaton -
Danzig -
Ghost -
Meshuggah -
All That Remains -
Danko Jones -
Soilwork -
Turbonegro -
Asking Alexandria -
Clutch - 
Graveyard -
Entombed -
Napalm Death -
Carcass -
The Dillinger Escape Plan -
Pentagram -
Marduk -
Kvelertak -
Cult of Luna -
The Devil Wears Prada -
The Ghost Inside -
Between the Buried and Me -
The Sword - 
Witchcraft -
Hardcore Superstar - 
Katatonia -
Amaranthe -
Love and Death -
Naglfar -
The Kristet Utseende -
The Resistance -
Thyrfing -
Terra Tenebrosa -
Bombus -
Thundermother -
Eldkraft -
Port Noir -
Undercroft -
Sister Sin -
Constrain -
Crunge -
Imber -
Nox Vorago -
Degial - 
Tribulation -
Eldrimner -
Minora -
bravo metal -
bedeng metal

References

External links
Official website
Photos from Metaltown 2006
Review from Metaltown 2010 - Day 1 (English)
Review from Metaltown 2010 - Day 2 (English)

Heavy metal festivals in Sweden
Music festivals in Sweden
Music festivals established in 2004
Summer events in Sweden